Azeta is a genus of moths in the family Erebidae.

Species
 Azeta caudalis Felder & Rogenhofer, 1874
 Azeta ceramina (Hubner, 1821)
 Azeta leucoma Felder & Rogenhofer, 1874
 Azeta melanea (Stoll, 1782)
 Azeta mimica Felder & Rogenhofer, 1874
 Azeta quassa Walker, 1858
 Azeta repugnalis (Hübner, 1825)
 Azeta reuteri Saalmuller, 1881
 Azeta rhodogaster Guenee, 1852
 Azeta rufescens Schaus, 1912
 Azeta schausi Barnes & Benjamin, 1924
 Azeta schausiodes Poole, 1989
 Azeta signans (Walker, 1858)
 Azeta turbida Butler, 1879
 Azeta uncas Guenee, 1852
 Azeta versicolor Fabricius, 1794

References
 Azeta at Markku Savela's Lepidoptera and Some Other Life Forms
 Natural History Museum Lepidoptera genus database

Eulepidotinae
Moth genera